Parroquia de Nuestra Señora del Refugio is a church in Puerto Vallarta's 5 de Diciembre neighborhood, in the Mexican state of Jalisco. The church is across the street from Plaza Hidalgo.

References

External links 

 

Buildings and structures in Puerto Vallarta
Churches in Mexico